Suakin or Sawakin (Beja: Oosook) is a port city in northeastern Sudan, on the west coast of the Red Sea.

Suakin used to be considered the height of medieval luxury on the Red Sea, but the old city built of coral is now in ruins. In 1983, the adjacent historic mainland town, known as the Geyf, had a population of 18,030 and the 2009 estimate is 43,337. Ferries run daily from Suakin to Jeddah in Saudi Arabia.

Etymology
The Beja name for Suakin is Oosook. This is possibly from the Arabic word suq, meaning market. In Beja, the locative case for this is isukib, whence Suakin might have derived. The spelling on Admiralty charts in the late 19th century was "Sauakin", but in the popular press "Suakim" was predominant.

History

Ancient
Suakin was likely Ptolemy's Port of Good Hope, Limen Evangelis, which is similarly described as lying on a circular island at the end of a long inlet. Under the Ptolemies and Romans, though, the Red Sea's major port was Berenice to the north. The growth of the Muslim caliphate shifted trade first to the Hijaz and then to the Persian Gulf.

Medieval
The collapse of the Abbasids and growth of Fatimid Egypt changed this and Al-Qusayr and Aydhab became important emporia, trading with India and ferrying African pilgrims to Mecca. Suakin was first mentioned by name in the 10th century by al-Hamdani, who says it was already an ancient town. At that time, Suakin was a small Beja settlement, but it began to expand after the abandonment of the port of Badi to its south. The Crusades and Mongol invasions drove more trade into the region: there are a number of references to Venetian merchants residing at Suakin and Massawa as early as the 14th century.

One of Suakin's rulers, Ala al-Din al-Asba'ani, angered the Mamluk sultan Baybars by seizing the goods of merchants who died at sea nearby. In 1264, the governor of Qus and his general Ikhmin Ala al-Din attacked with the support of Aydhab. Al-Asba'ani was forced to flee the city. The continuing enmity between the two towns is testified to by reports that after the destruction of Aydhab by Sultan Barsbay in 1426, the refugees, who fled to Suakin instead of Dongola, were all slaughtered.

The Beja were originally Christian. Despite the town's formal submission to the Mamluks in 1317, O. G. S. Crawford believed that the city remained a center of Christianity into the 13th century. Muslim immigrants such as the Banu Kanz gradually transformed this: Ibn Battuta records that in 1332, there was a Muslim "sultan" of Suakin, al-Sharif Zaid ibn-Abi Numayy ibn-'Ajlan, who was the son of a Meccan sharif. Following the region's inheritance laws, he had inherited the local leadership from his Bejan maternal uncles. In the fifteenth century, Suakin was briefly part of the Adal Sultanate. Suakin was sieged by the Portuguese in 1513 and captured briefly in 1541.

Ottoman

Ottoman sultan Selim I nominally added the port to the territory of the Ottoman Empire in 1517, though it was only loosely controlled, until the Ottoman province of Habesh was established in 1555 with the residence of its pasha in Suakin. The Ottomans restored the two main mosques - Shafi'i and Hanafi, strengthened the walls of the fort and built new roads and buildings. As the Portuguese explorers discovered and perfected the sea route around Africa and the Ottomans were unable to stop this trade, the local merchants began to abandon the town.

Some trade was kept up with the Sultanate of Sennar, but by the 18th and 19th centuries, the Swiss traveler Johann Ludwig Burckhardt found two-thirds of the homes in ruin. The Khedive Isma'il received Suakin from the Ottomans in 1865 and attempted to revitalize it: Egypt built new houses, mills, mosques, hospitals, and a church for immigrant Copts.

British rule
The British Army was involved at Suakin in 1883 –1885 and Lord Kitchener was there in this period leading the Egyptian Army contingent. Suakin was his headquarters and his force survived a lengthy siege there.

The Australian colonial forces of Victoria offered their torpedo boat HMVS Childers and gunboats HMVS Victoria and HMVS Albert, which arrived in Suakin on 19 March 1884 on their delivery voyage from Britain, only to be released as fighting had moved inland. They departed on 23 March, arriving in Melbourne on 25 June 1884. An essentially civilian military force of 770 men from New South Wales, including some of the Naval Brigade, arrived in Suakin in March 1885 and served until mid-May.

After the defeat of the Mahdist State , the British preferred to develop the new Port Sudan, rather than engage in the extensive rebuilding and expansion that would have been necessary to make Suakin comparable. By 1922, the last of the British had left.

21st century 
SInce 2000, Sudan’s National Corporation for Antiquities and Museums has undertaken research and documented the history of Suakin, and in 2022, the online project Sudan Memory published historical photographs, architectural drawings and a 3D reconstruction of the town on its website.

On 17 January 2018, as part of a rapprochement with Sudan, Turkey was granted a 99-year lease over Suakin island. Turkey plans to restore the ruined Ottoman port city on the island.

Buildings of Suakin

A detailed description of the buildings of Suakin, including measured plans and detailed sketches, can be found in The Coral Buildings of Suakin: Islamic Architecture, Planning, Design and Domestic Arrangements in a Red Sea Port by Jean-Pierre Greenlaw, Kegan Paul International, 1995, .

Climate
Suakin has a very hot desert climate (Köppen BWh) with brutally hot and humid, though dry, summers and very warm winters.

References

Further reading 

 Greenlaw, Jean-Pierre (1995) The Coral Buildings of Suakin: Islamic Architecture, Planning, Design and Domestic Arrangements in a Red Sea Port. Kegan Paul International, 
Um, Nancy. "Greenlaw's Suakin: the limits of architectural representation and the continuing lives of buildings in Coastal Sudan." African Arts, vol. 44, no. 4, 2011, p. 36+. Gale Literature Resource Center
Cooke, B. Kennedy, and B. Kennedy-Cooke. “The Red Sea coast in 1540.” Sudan Notes and Records, vol. 16, no. 2, 1933, pp. 151–59, http://www.jstor.org/stable/41716059. Accessed 11 Apr. 2022.
 Livro de Lisuarte de Abreu:  fac-simile. Comissão Nacional para as Comemorações dos Descobrimentos Portugueses. Lisboa, 1992.  Vasco Graça Moura
 Couto, Diogo do; Observações sobre as principais causas da decadência dos portugueses na Ásia

External links 

Comparative Vocabularies of the Languages Spoken at Suakin: Arabic, Hadendoa, Beni-Amer
Pictures of Suakin on Atlas Obscura
Suakin: Time and Tide — on Saudi Aramco World
Suakin Island - A Virtual Experience A 3D reconstruction of the Island
https://observador.pt/2016/12/16/diogo-do-couto-o-portugues-da-india-ha-500-anos/

Populated places in Red Sea (state)
Port cities and towns of the Red Sea
Ramsar sites in Sudan
Cities in Sudan